Stephenson MacGordon (February 29, 1892 – June 6, 1916) was a record-holding pioneer aviator who died in a crash in 1916.

Biography
He was born on February 29, 1892, in Menominee, Michigan, to Charles Hackley McGordon (1871–1921).

He was an instructor at the Curtiss Flying School.

He died on June 6, 1916, in Newport News, Virginia, when the tail of his plane lifted during landing. His propeller hit the runway and a fire killed him. His student in the rear seat escaped with minor injuries.

References

1892 births
1916 deaths
Accidental deaths in Virginia
American aviators
Aviators killed in aviation accidents or incidents in the United States
Victims of aviation accidents or incidents in 1916